The Individual Ice Speedway World Championship is an Ice speedway championship held annually to determine an individual World Champion.

History
The first Championships were held in 1966. A European Championship was held for the two years preceding the World Championships.The event has been dominated by the Soviet Union/Russia, who have won all but seven of the World Championship titles since 1966. Sweden has won five times, Czechoslovakia twice and Finland once.

Medalists

In 2021 and 2022 Russian athletes competed as neutral competitors using the designation MFR (Motorcycle Federation of Russia), as the Court of Arbitration for Sport upheld a ban on Russia competing at World Championships. The ban was implemented by the World Anti-Doping Agency in response to state-sponsored doping program of Russian athletes.

See also 
 Ice speedway
 Ice racing
 Team Ice Racing World Championship

References 

Ice speedway competitions
Speedway
Speedway, Ice